Bolívar is a station on Line E of the Buenos Aires Underground at is located on the Diagonal Sur avenue by the Plaza de Mayo. From here, passengers may transfer to the Perú Station on Line A and the Catedral Station on Line D. The station was opened on 24 April 1966 as the eastern terminus of the extension of the line from San José. On 3 June 2019, the line was extended to Retiro.

References

External links

Buenos Aires Underground stations
Railway stations opened in 1966
1966 establishments in Argentina